Tatiana Búa and Laura Thorpe were the defending champions, but Thorpe chose not to participate. Búa partners Alona Fomina, but lost in the first round to Hsieh Su-wei and Nicole Melichar.

Hsieh and Melichar won the champion, beating Jana Čepelová and Lourdes Domínguez Lino in the final, 1–6, 6–3, [10–3].

Seeds

Draw

References 
 Draw

Open Feminin de Marseille - Doubles